Japan > Mie Prefecture > Kitamuro District

 is a rural district located in Mie Prefecture, Japan.

As of September 1, 2012, the district had an estimated population of 17,885 and a population density of 69.6 persons/km2. The total area was 257.01 km2.

At present, Kimamuro District contains one town:

Timeline

 July 22, 1878 - Due to early Meiji period land reforms, Kitamuro District was formed when former Muro District, Kii Province was split into Kitamuro and Minamimuro Districts within Mie Prefecture and Higashimuro and Nishimuro Districts within Wakayama Prefecture.
 April 1, 1889 - With the establishment of municipalities, Kitamuro District was organized into one town and 9 villages:
 April 1, 1889 (1 town, 9 villages)
 Town of Owase(尾鷲町) - Village of Kuki (九鬼村) (currently part of the City of Owase (尾鷲市))
 Village of Aiga(相賀村) - Village of Funatsu (船津村), Village of Nagashima (長島村), Village of Minose (三野瀬村), 二郷村, Village of Akaba (赤羽村)(currently part of the Town of Kihoku(紀北町))
 Village of Nishiki(錦村) (currently part of Town of Taiki(大紀町))
 Village of Hikimoto(引本村) (currently part of the City of Owase and Town of Kihoku)
 May 31, 1897 (1 town, 11 villages)
 Shimakatsuura(島勝浦) and Shiroura(白浦), part of Hikimoto, becomes the village of Katsuragi (桂城村).
 Sugariura(須賀利浦), part of Hikimoto, becomes the village of Sugari (須賀利村).
 1899
 February 2 - Hikimoto was elevated to town status (引本町). (2 towns, 10 villages)
 February 21 - Nagashima was elevated to town status (長島町). (3 towns, 9 villages)
 November 3, 1928 - Aiga was elevated to town status (相賀町). (4 towns, 8 villages)
 November 10, 1940 - Nishiki was elevated to town status (錦町). (5 towns, 7 villages)
 December 15, 1950 - The village of 二郷 merged into the town of Nagashima. (5 towns, 6 villages)
 1954
 June 20 - The town of Owase and the villages of Kuki and Sugari, and the villages of Kitawauchi (北輪内村) and Minamiwauchi (南輪内村) from Minamimuro District, merged to form the city of Owase. (4 towns, 4 villages)
 August - The towns of Aiga and Hikimoto and the villages of Funatsu and 桂城村 merged to become the town of Miyama (海山町). (3 towns, 2 villages)
 1955
 January 1 - The village of Minose merged with the town of Nagashima. (3 towns, 1 village)
 February 5 - The village of Akaba merged with the town of Nagashima. (3 towns)
 February 1, 1957 - The town of Nishiki merged with the village of Kashiwazaki (柏崎村), Watarai District, to become the town of Kisei, Watarai District. (2 towns)
 August 1, 1970 - Nagashima was renamed Kiinagashima (紀伊長島町).
 October 11, 2005 - The towns of Kiinagashima and Miyama merged to become the new town of Kihoku. (1 town)

Kitamuro District